

The gill   or teacup is a unit of measurement for volume equal to a quarter of a pint. It is no longer in common use, except in regard to the volume of alcoholic spirits measures.

In imperial units
{|
|- style="vertical-align: top;"
| 1 imperial gill
| ≡ 5 imperial fluid ounces
|-
| || ≡  imperial gallon
|-
| || ≡  imperial pint
|-
| || ≡ 142.0653125 mL
|-
| || ≈ 142 mL
|-
| || ≈ 1.2 US gills
|-
| || = 40 Imperial fluid drams
|-
| || ≡  Imperial cups
|-
| || ≈ 8.67 in3
|}

In United States customary units
{|
|- style="vertical-align: top;"
| 1 US gill
| ≡ 4 US fl oz
|-
| || ≡  US gallon
|-
| || ≡  US pint
|-
| || ≡  US cup
|-
| || ≡ 8 tablespoons
|-
| || ≡ 24 teaspoons
|-
| || ≡ 32 US fluid drams
|-
| || ≡ 7 in3
|-
| || ≡ 118.29411825 mL
|-
| || ≈ 118 mL
|-
| || ≈  imperial gills
|}

After metrication, this was replaced by measures of either , at the discretion of the proprietor.

Half of a gill is a jack, or an eighth of a pint. But in northern England, a quarter pint could also be called a jack or a noggin, rather than a gill, and in some areas a half pint could be called a gill, particularly for beer and milk.

In Ireland, the standard spirit measure was historically  gill.

In Scotland, there were additional sizes:
big gill = 
wee gill = 
wee half gill = 
nip=

In popular culture
There are occasional references to a gill in popular culture, such as in:

Literature
 In L. Frank Baum's The Patchwork Girl of Oz, one of the ingredients required for a magic spell is a gill of water from a dark well.  In chapter 19, the obscure unit is used for humor including a pun with the nursery rhyme "Jack and Jill", which also involved a well.
 In George Orwell's Animal Farm, Moses the Raven is allotted a gill of beer a day after he returns, with the implication that this is part of his payment for supporting the farm leaders, the pigs.
 Dan Simmons' novel, The Terror (2007), makes frequent references to gills of grog and rum.
 In Robert Louis Stevenson's Treasure Island there are uses of the measure gill, with Israel Hands drinking a gill of brandy in the chapter 'I Strike the Jolly Roger'. In "Kidnapped" the protagonist, David Balfour, is "forced" "to drink about a gill" of brandy.

Music
The cumulative song "The Barley Mow".
The traditional English folk song "Byker Hill" begins with the words, "If I had another penny, I would have another gill."
The Fall's song "Edinburgh Man" contains the line "Keep me away from the Festival and just give me a warm quarter-gill."

Television
 A gill is also referenced in Archer season 2, episode 3 ("Blood Test") when Barry explains to Archer that a litre is, "about 8 gills" (the word gill is mispronounced in this exchange).
In "Bart the Genius," an episode of The Simpsons, a child tricks Bart by offering, "I'll trade you 1,000 picolitres of my milk for four gills of yours." (A picolitre is a trillionth of a litre, so Bart is losing almost a pint of milk in this exchange.)

Mispronunciation
Because of its more widely used homograph, gill has sometimes been mispronounced with a hard 'g' sound.

 FX's animated cartoon Archer, mispronounced gill in the episodes "Blood Test" (Season 2, Episode 3) and "Heart of Archness: Part Three" (Season 3, Episode 3).

Notes

References

Units of volume
Imperial units
Customary units of measurement in the United States
Alcohol measurement
Cooking weights and measures